Jim Zoet (born December 20, 1953) is a Canadian former professional basketball player.

Born in Uxbridge, Ontario, Zoet played college basketball for the Kent State Golden Flashes in the United States and the Lakehead Thunderwolves in Canada. Zoet was a member of the 1980 Canadian Olympic Men's Basketball Team, and he also played professionally in the Netherlands, England, Argentina, Mexico and the Philippines. Undrafted, he played in the National Basketball Association (NBA) during the 1982–83 season for the Detroit Pistons, appearing in 7 games and scoring 2 points. Zoet and Brian Heaney are the only two U Sports players to have played in an NBA game.

References

External links 
College statistics

1953 births
Living people
Basketball people from Ontario
Canadian expatriate sportspeople in England
Canadian expatriate basketball people in the Netherlands
Canadian expatriate basketball people in the United States
Canadian men's basketball players
1978 FIBA World Championship players
1990 FIBA World Championship players
Centers (basketball)
Detroit Pistons players
Kent State Golden Flashes men's basketball players
Lakehead Thunderwolves basketball players
National Basketball Association players from Canada
People from Uxbridge, Ontario
Undrafted National Basketball Association players
Canadian expatriate basketball people in the Philippines
Philippine Basketball Association imports